Rubtsovsk Airport  is an airport in Russia located 6 km north of Rubtsovsk.

The airport was purchased in the late nineties by a private individual primarily for the purpose of obtaining access to fuel stores at the airport for resale.  The airport is currently inoperable and is used mainly by youth for drag racing.

References
RussianAirFields.com

Airports built in the Soviet Union
Airports in Altai Krai